Chain of Command is the seventh studio album by the American power metal band, Jag Panzer. The album was recorded in 1987 and went unreleased at the time, yet bootlegged since 1988.
It was finally released by Century Media for the first time, with "new" cover art and a remaster job, on June 21, 2004. The label released only 5,000 copies.

Five songs have been re-recorded by the band over the years until the long delayed release of the album.

Track listing

Personnel
Bob Parduba – vocals
Mark Briody – guitar
Christian Lasegue – guitar
John Tetley – bass
Rikard Stjernquist – drums

References

2004 albums
Century Media Records albums
Jag Panzer albums